L'Estrange v F Graucob Ltd [1934] 2 KB 394 is a leading English contract law case on the incorporation of terms into a contract by signature. There are exceptions to the rule that a person is bound by his or her signature, including fraud, misrepresentation and non est factum.

Lord Denning, as a young barrister, represented the company in this action, but later - for instance, speaking in Parliament in 1977 - made clear that he regarded the decision as wrong.

Facts
Miss Harriet Mary L'Estrange had a cafe in Great Ormes Road, Llandudno. Two travelling salesmen, Mr Page and Mr Berse, representing Mr Graucob's slot machine business in City Road, London, came to visit her. She was persuaded to purchase a cigarette machine and signed a document entitled 'Sales Agreement', stating:

"Please forward me as soon as possible: One Six Column Junior Ilam Automatic Machine... which I agree to purchase from you on the terms stated below...."

Further along, in small print, an exclusion clause was stated:

"This agreement contains all the terms and conditions under which I agree to purchase the machine specified above, and any express or implied condition, statement, or warranty, statutory or otherwise not stated herein is hereby excluded.) H. M. L'Estrange."

She did not read the document. She was supposed to pay for the machine in instalments. But after machine was delivered it got jammed and did not work, despite mechanics coming to fix it. Miss L'Estrange thus refused to continue paying her installments and brought an action in the Carnarvonshire County Court at Llandudno for the sums already paid, arguing the machine was not fit for purpose. Mr Graucob contended that any warranties for fitness were expressly excluded by the contractual agreement she signed.

Judgment

County Court
The judge held, following the Lord Herschell LC in Richardson, Spence & Co v Rowntree, that Mr Graucob was not entitled to rely on the exclusion clause. Lord Herschell had asked three questions: (1) Did the plaintiff know that there was writing or printing on the document? (2) Did she know that the writing or printing contained conditions relating to the terms of the contract? (3) Did the defendants do what was reasonably sufficient to give the plaintiff notice of the conditions? The judge held that question (3) was not satisfied.

Mr Graucob appealed. Alfred Thompson Denning, at that time a barrister, represented F Graucob Ltd. Fifty years later, as Master of the Rolls, Denning described the case as emblematic of a "bleak winter for our law of contract" in his judgment on George Mitchell (Chesterhall) Ltd v Finney Lock Seeds Ltd.

Court of Appeal
Scrutton LJ found the exclusion clause formed part of the contract. It was immaterial that L'Estrange had not read the clause. The fact that she signed it meant that she was bound by it. She is deemed to have read and agreed to the terms of the contract.

Maugham LJ concurred, though expressing his regret at the result. He held he was bound to do so. He said the only two possibilities were that the document was signed non est factum, or that the document was induced to be signed by a misrepresentation.

Significance
The case still holds significance, not because it would be decided the same today in relation to a consumer, but because it establishes the basic principle that one is bound by their signature, as a general starting point. This is particularly important among businesses. If the same facts arose again today, the case would be regulated by unfair terms legislation, and Miss L'Estrange would have won, despite having signed. The Sale of Goods Act 1979 section 14(3) implies that goods for sale have a warranty from the seller as to their fitness. Between two businesses dealing as commercial parties of equal bargaining strength, this term could be excluded. But when one party is a consumer, the Unfair Contract Terms Act 1977 section 6(2)(a) stipulates that the warranty about fitness cannot be excluded. So Graucob would have been in breach of contract for providing a faulty machine in any event.

In any event, one commentator, Spencer, argued that Graucob’s representatives knew Miss L’Estrange was making a mistake, and therefore should not have won. He argued refusal to apply the law on unilateral mistake where there is a signature comes from misunderstanding the parol evidence rule and non est factum rules.

In the Canadian case, Tilden Rent-A-Car Co. v. Clendenning the Ontario Court of Appeal held the signature would only bind if it was reasonable for the party relying on the signed document to believe the signer assented to onerous terms (i.e. unlike Grogan, where the document is intended to have contractual effect). By contrast, in 2004 in Toll (FGCT) Pty Ltd v Alphapharm Pty Ltd, the High Court of Australia challenged the Clendenning decision robustly and affirmed L'Estrange. In the UK, in Peekay Intermark Ltd v Australia and New Zealand Banking Group Ltd Moore-Bick LJ was at pains to emphasise that L’Estrange sets out ‘an important principle of English law which underpins the whole of commercial life; any erosion of it would have serious repercussions.’

See also

George Mitchell (Chesterhall) Ltd v Finney Lock Seeds Ltd
Autoclenz Ltd v Belcher [2011] UKSC 41

Notes

References
J Spencer, ‘Signature, Consent, and the Rule in L’Estrange v Graucob’ [1973] Cambridge Law Journal 104

Lord Denning cases
English incorporation case law
Court of Appeal (England and Wales) cases
1934 in British law
1934 in case law